Charles Ray may refer to:

Charles Ray (actor) (1891–1943), silent film star
Charles Ray (artist) (born 1953), American sculptor
Charles Ray (editor) (1874–1962), English editor of encyclopaedias, mainly for children
Charles Ray (admiral), United States Coast Guard admiral
Charles Ray (Indiana judge) (1829–1912), Associate Justice of the Indiana Supreme Court
Charles A. Ray (born 1945), U.S. diplomat and ambassador
Charles Bennett Ray (1807–1886), African-American abolitionist and editor of The Colored American
Charles R. Ray (1938–1982), US Army officer
Charles W. Ray (1872–1959), Philippine–American War Medal of Honor recipient
Chucky (Child's Play), Charles Ray, main villain and serial killer from the Child's Play movies

See also
Ray Charles (disambiguation)